The Japanese destroyer {{nihongo|Kikuzuki|菊月|means "Chrysanthemum Moon", and means the 9th month in the lunar calendar}} was one of twelve s built for the Imperial Japanese Navy (IJN) during the 1920s. During the Pacific War, she participated in the Battle of Guam in December 1941 and the New Guinea and Solomon Islands Campaigns in 1942. Kikuzuki was destroyed during the invasion of Tulagi in May.

Design and description
The Mutsuki class was an improved version of the s and was the first with triple  torpedo tubes. They were powered by two Parsons geared steam turbines, each driving one propeller shaft, using steam provided by four Kampon water-tube boilers. Their crew consisted of 150 officers and crewmen.

The main armament of the Mutsuki-class ships consisted of four  Type 3 guns in single mounts; one gun forward of the superstructure, one between the two funnels and the last pair back to back atop the aft superstructure. The guns were numbered '1' to '4' from front to rear. The ships carried two above-water triple sets of 61-centimeter torpedo tubes; one mount was between the forward superstructure and the forward gun and the other was between the aft funnel and aft superstructure. Four reload torpedoes were provided for the tubes. They carried 18 depth charges and could also carry 16 mines. They could also fitted with minesweeping gear.

Kikuzuki was one of six Mutsuki-class ships reconstructed in 1935–36, with their hulls strengthened, raked caps fitted to the funnels and shields to the torpedo mounts. In 1941–42, most of those ships were converted into fast transports with No. 2 and No. 3 guns removed. In addition, ten license-built  Type 96 light AA guns and at least two  Type 93 anti-aircraft machineguns were installed. The minesweeping gear was replaced by four depth charge throwers and the ships now carried a total of 36 depth charges. Three more 25 mm guns may have been added in 1942.

Construction and career
Kikuzuki, built at the Maizuru Naval Arsenal, was laid down on 15 June 1925, launched on 15 May 1926 and completed on 20 November 1926. Originally commissioned simply as Destroyer No. 31, the ship was assigned the name Kikuzuki on 1 August 1928. In the late 1930s, she participated in combat during the Second Sino-Japanese War, covering the landings of Japanese troops in central and southern China, and the invasion of French Indochina.

Pacific War
At the time of the attack on Pearl Harbor, Kikuzuki was part of Desron 23 under Carrier Division 2 in the IJN 1st Air Fleet, and deployed from Hahajima in the Ogasawara Islands as part of the Japanese invasion force for the invasion of Guam. She returned to Truk in early January 1942 to join the invasion force for Operation R in Kavieng, New Ireland on 23 January, returning to Truk one month later. In March, Kikuzuki assisted in covering landings of Japanese forces during Operation SR in the northern Solomon Islands, Lae and Admiralty Islands. She was reassigned to the IJN 4th Fleet on 10 April.

Participating in Operation Mo, during the invasion of Tulagi from 3 to 4 May 1942, Kikuzuki was torpedoed while in Tulagi harbor by United States Navy aircraft from the aircraft carrier  on 4 May, killing 12 crewmen and injuring 22 others. The submarine chaser Toshi Maru No.3 towed her to the beach at Gavutu Island and took off the survivors. Kikuzuki then slid back into the water on 5 May 1942 during the next high tide cycle and sank at coordinates . Kikuzuki was struck from the Navy List on 25 May 1942.

After the capture of Tulagi by American forces, the U.S. Navy repair ship  salvaged Kikuzuki′s wreck, hoping to obtain military intelligence. Kikuzuki′s partially-dismantled hulk still lies in Ghovana Bay on the island of Nggela Sule (location ).

Notes

References

External links
Mutsuki-class destroyers on Materials of the Imperial Japanese Navy

Mutsuki-class destroyers
Ships built by Maizuru Naval Arsenal
1926 ships
Second Sino-Japanese War naval ships of Japan
World War II destroyers of Japan
Destroyers sunk by aircraft
World War II shipwrecks in the Pacific Ocean
Shipwrecks in the Solomon Sea
Marine salvage
Intelligence of World War II
Maritime incidents in May 1942
Ships sunk by US aircraft